Hendon Burn is a stream flowing through Sunderland, Tyne and Wear. serving as a drainage basin for most of the city's southern half, its route proceeds from Doxford Park through the Farringdon Country Park area and into Gilley Law, Silksworth, Barnes, Ashbrooke and Backhouse Park before reaching the sea at Hendon.

See Also
Bishopwearmouth Burn

References

City of Sunderland